The Oxford Handbook of Philosophy of Death is a 2013 book edited by Ben Bradley, Fred Feldman and Jens Johansson in which the authors explore philosophical aspects of death.

Reception
The book was reviewed by James Stacey Taylor, Subhasis Chattopadhyay, and Mark Alfino.

References

External links 

2013 non-fiction books
Oxford University Press books
English-language books
Edited volumes
Oxford Handbooks
Works about philosophy of death